Stare Dobre Małżeństwo (in English translation "good old marriage") is a Polish music group.

The band derives from the so-called "student music", popular in Poland. This musical style is characterised by the use of a guitar for accompaniment, while the lyrics often talk about hiking in the Polish mountains, love and adventure. SDM, however, quickly created their own style, and became famous due to their interesting musical interpretations of poems written by the famous Polish poet Edward Stachura. Another important author, who worked with the band, is the Polish poet Adam Ziemianin.

Currently, the band has moved away from "student music" towards what can be described as acoustic blues. Furthermore, they often use poems of the forgotten poet Jan Rybowicz whose work addressed important questions about human existence.

Discography

References

External links 
 

Sung poetry of Poland
Polish musical groups